"That's the Way (I Like It)" is a song by American disco and funk band KC and the Sunshine Band from their self-titled second studio album (1975). The single became the band's second No. 1 hit in the Billboard Hot 100, and it is one of the few chart-toppers in history to hit No. 1 on more than one occasion during a one-month period, as it did between November and December 1975. It topped the American pop chart for one week, and then was replaced by another disco song, "Fly, Robin, Fly" by Silver Convention. "That's the Way (I Like It)" returned to No. 1 for one more week after "Fly, Robin, Fly" completed three weeks at the top. "That's the Way (I Like It)" also spent one week at No. 1 in the soul singles chart. The song is in natural minor.

The song was also an international chart hit, reaching No. 1 in Canada and the Netherlands and charting in Australia (No. 5), Belgium (No. 2), Ireland (No. 17), New Zealand (No. 12), Norway (No. 5), the United Kingdom (No. 4) and West Germany (No. 20).

Record World said that "A spirited, uplifting sound is based around a theme which should be reverberating across the country in no time!"

For release as a single and radio airplay, the song was toned down from the original recording, which would have jeopardized it receiving getting radio airplay at the time. However the sexual overtones may have improved the record's reception at discos, increasing its overall popularity in the charts.

Space Jam film version 
In 1996, Spin Doctors and Biz Markie recorded a musical version for the Space Jam soundtrack.

Charts

Weekly charts

Year-end charts

All-time charts

Certifications

Dead or Alive version

In 1979, English singer and television personality Pete Burns used the chorus in the song "Black Leather", composed and recorded in the early stages of Dead or Alive (then known as Nightmares in Wax), and in 1984, Dead or Alive covered the song for their debut studio album, Sophisticated Boom Boom (1984).

Track listings
 7" single
 "That's the Way (I Like It)" – 3:38	
 "Do It" – 3:53	
 		
 7" picture single
 "That's the Way (I Like It)" – 3:37	
 "Keep That Body Strong (That's the Way)" – 3:37

 12" maxi
 "That's the Way (I Like It)" (Extended Version) – 5:52
 "Keep That Body Strong (That's the Way)" – 3:37

Chart

Clock version

In 1997, British pop/dance act Clock released a cover of the song, which appears on their Japan-only album release Boogie Sound. It was a moderate hit in early 1998, peaking at No. 17 in Ireland, No. 11 in the United Kingdom and No. 66 in France.

Samples

Critical reception
A reviewer from Music Week rated Clock's version two out of five, adding, "But with Clock's established grip on the Top 20, no doubt it will sell." The magazine's Alan Jones wrote, "Clock get short shrift from critics, though record buyers can't get enough of them. They will certainly tick up another hit with That's The Way (I Like It), an obvious cover of the old KC & The Sunshine Band track currently doing service as a TV commercial soundtrack. It stays close to the original, and will provide one of the first big hits of 1998."

Track listing
 CD single, CD 1, UK (1998)
"That's The Way (I Like It)" (Radio Mix) – 3:45
"That's The Way (I Like It)" (Ultra Disco Radio Mix) – 3:19
"That's The Way (I Like It)" (Short Stab) – 4:01
"That's The Way (I Like It)" (video) – 3:12

Charts

Bibliography

References

External links
 
 Music Legends Part 1: KC & The Sunshine Band
 "The Complexity of Songs", Knuth, Donald E. (1984).

1975 songs
1975 singles
1984 singles
1997 singles
KC and the Sunshine Band songs
Dead or Alive (band) songs
Clock (dance act) songs
Billboard Hot 100 number-one singles
Cashbox number-one singles
RPM Top Singles number-one singles
Dutch Top 40 number-one singles
Songs written by Harry Wayne Casey
Songs written by Richard Finch (musician)
TK Records singles
Metronome Records singles